Hamburg Main Street Historic District is a national historic district located at Hamburg in Erie County, New York. The district encompasses 62 contributing buildings along two blocks along Main Street in the village of Hamburg.  The district includes a variety of residential, commercial, religious, and government buildings.  Notable buildings include the First Baptist Church (c. 1870), St. James United Church of Christ (1928), Hamburg Presbyterian Church (1952), Bank of Hamburgh (1907, 1967), People's Bank (1926, 1966), and the Walters Building (1917).

It was listed on the National Register of Historic Places in 2012.

Gallery

References

Historic districts on the National Register of Historic Places in New York (state)
Historic districts in Erie County, New York
National Register of Historic Places in Erie County, New York